The Rockford Rivets are a baseball team in the Northwoods League, a collegiate summer baseball league. The league's only team based in Illinois, their home games are played at Rivets Stadium in Loves Park.

History
Following the demise of the Frontier League's Rockford Aviators, their ballpark was put on the market.  On October 14, 2015, the Northwoods League officially announced that Rockford Baseball Properties, LLC (composed of league president Dick Radatz, Jr. and Chad Bauer) had purchased the ballpark and would field a team in the league to begin play in the 2016 season.  The team would be a member of the South Division, with the La Crosse Loggers moving to the North Division (taking the place of the recently folded Alexandria Blue Anchors).

On November 18, the team announced that Northern Illinois Huskies baseball and Madison Mallards alumnus Brian Smith would serve as the team's first manager.

Finally, on February 11, the Rivets name, logo and colors were officially announced.

Seasons

Rivets in the Pros

References

External links
Rockford Rivets official site
Northwoods League official site

Northwoods League teams
Amateur baseball teams in Illinois
Rivets
Baseball teams established in 2015